Piia Kotikumpu  (born 11 June 1985) is a Finnish retired ice hockey player and former member of the Finnish national ice hockey team. She represented Finland at the IIHF Women's World Championships in 2008 and 2009, winning bronze at both tournaments.

Kotikumpu played eleven seasons in the Naisten SM-sarja, ten seasons with the Espoo Blues Naiset and one season with the women’s representative ice hockey team of Alavuden Peli-Veikot (APV). With the Espoo Blues, she won the Finnish Championship eight times – in 2001, 2002, 2003, 2004, 2005, 2007, 2008, and 2009.

References

External links 
 

Living people
1985 births
People from Lappeenranta
Finnish women's ice hockey forwards
Espoo Blues Naiset players
Sportspeople from South Karelia